Thangaikku Oru Thalattu is a 1990 Indian Tamil language drama film directed by K. S. Madhangan. The film stars Arjun Sarja and Seetha. It was released on 23 November 1990.

Plot

Gopi, a poor youth, lives with his mother and his uncle Baba. J. M. J is a businessman who cheats and kills rich people. Arun, an honest journalist, is killed by J. M. J's henchmen. Prakash, who looks like Gopi, arrests an innocent young woman, Priya. Janaki, Prakash's sister, is Priya's friend. Prakash believed that Priya was a prostitute but in a function, he knows her real identity and he apologizes to Priya. Priya becomes a journalist like her brother. With Arun's written and photos evidence, she investigates on J. M. J with Prakash's help. Janaki gets married, but she and her husband die in a car accident. Prakash arrests his sister's killer, but due to the finance minister's kidnapping, he has to release him. Later, he saves the finance minister without releasing his sister's killer. Gopi's uncle reveals to Gopi the truth. Gopi had a twin brother, and his father was killed by J. M. J. Gopi is kidnapped by J. M. J to spoil Prakash's police career. He manages to escape from there. Gopi's uncle also reveals to Prakash his past. Gopi and Prakash fight against J. M. J's henchmen. Gopi dies with J. M. J.

Cast

Arjun Sarja as Gopi / Prakash
Seetha as Priya
K. R. Vijaya as Gopi's mother
Ramesh Raja as J. M. J
Renuka as Kasthuri (Stella)
Senthil as Arumugam
Delhi Ganesh as Arun (guest appearance)

Soundtrack

The film score and the soundtrack were composed by Shankar–Ganesh. The soundtrack, released in 1990, features 5 tracks with lyrics written by Muthulingam and Shanmugham.

Release
Thangaikku Oru Thalattu was released on 23 November 1990 alongside another Arjun starrer Aatha Naan Pass Ayittaen.

References

1990 films
1990s Tamil-language films
Films scored by Shankar–Ganesh